Sharjah Islamic Bank, formerly known as the National Bank of Sharjah, is a publicly listed Islamic bank headquartered in the emirate of Sharjah in the United Arab Emirates. The bank was established in 1976 and in 2004 converted into a fully Shariah compliant bank. The bank provides Sharia-compliant products and services to serve individuals, companies, institutions, and investors.

As an Islamic bank, SIB operates in accordance with the principles of Sharia law. This means that it does not charge or pay interest, and it does not engage in any transactions that involve riba (usury), gharar (uncertainty), or maysir (gambling). Instead, SIB uses Islamic finance techniques such as profit-sharing, leasing, and partnership to provide its customers with financial services that are consistent with Sharia principles. 

In August 2021, Sharjah Islamic Bank announced the launch of a new digital account that allows customers use the smart bank application to open an electronic account without the need to visit the branch.

Financial performance 
For the year 2022, Sharjah Islamic Bank (SIB) has posted net profit of AED 650.9 million.

Sponsorship

See also

Islamic banking
Shariah investments

References

External links
Sharjah Islamic Bank Official Website

Companies listed on the Abu Dhabi Securities Exchange
Companies based in the Emirate of Sharjah
Islamic banks of the United Arab Emirates